Ješevac (Serbian Cyrillic: Јешевац) is a mountain in central Serbia, near the town of Gornji Milanovac. Its highest peak Crni vrh has an elevation of 902 meters above sea level.

References

Mountains of Serbia
Rhodope mountain range